The 1960 United States Senate election in Idaho took place on November 8, 1960. Incumbent Republican Senator Henry Dworshak won re-election to a fourth term.

Primary elections
Primary elections were held on June 7, 1960, with the Democratic runoff being held three weeks later on June 28.

Democratic primary

Candidates
Gregg Potvin, attorney
Bob McLaughlin, lawyer
Compton I. White Jr.,mayor of Clark Fork
A. W. Brunt, real estate agent
Joseph R. Garry, president of the American Congress of Indians

Results

Republican primary

Candidates
Henry Dworshak, incumbent U.S. Senator

Results

General election

Results

See also 
 1960 United States Senate elections

References

Bibliography
 

1960
Idaho
United States Senate